Sodium/hydrogen exchanger 8 is a protein that in humans is encoded by the SLC9A8 gene.

Model organisms

Model organisms have been used in the study of SLC9A8 function. A conditional knockout mouse line, called Slc9a8tm1a(KOMP)Wtsi was generated as part of the International Knockout Mouse Consortium program — a high-throughput mutagenesis project to generate and distribute animal models of disease to interested scientists — at the Wellcome Trust Sanger Institute.

Male and female animals underwent a standardized phenotypic screen to determine the effects of deletion. Twenty one tests were carried out on mutant mice and one significant abnormality was observed: homozygous mutant animals had abnormal retinal morphology and pigmentation.

See also
 Solute carrier family

References

Further reading

Solute carrier family
Genes mutated in mice